The 1981–82 season was Port Vale's 70th season of football in the English Football League, and their fourth successive season (tenth overall) in the Fourth Division. John McGrath led his team to a seventh-place finish, a big improvement on the previous two seasons. Top-scorer Ernie Moss and midfielder Mark Chamberlain proved to be the stars of the season. The season was notable for Vale Park's lowest ever Football League attendance.

Overview

Fourth Division
The pre-season saw John McGrath make four new signings: defender Ray Deakin (Everton); midfielder Geoff Hunter (from Crewe Alexandra for £12,000); and forwards Ernie Moss (from Chesterfield for £12,000) and Jimmy Greenhoff (Toronto Blizzard). Attempts to re-sign Brian Horton failed. On 1 August, a heavy metal concert was held at Vale Park, headlined by local lad Lemmy's Motörhead. Some twenty thousand metal fans paid £7.50 admission each to boost club coffers. However Vale failed to win any of their pre-season friendlies, and in fact were embarrassed to lose 6–1 at home to local rivals Stoke City.

The season opened with four draws, somewhat ironic considering that McGrath had stated that 'forwards are much more important now' after the Football League changed a win from earning two points to three points. On 12 September, their club-record run of six consecutive draws came to an end. Four victories in five games then put Vale into seventh place, and Colin Tartt was signed from Chesterfield for £15,000. A 2–0 home defeat to Sheffield United in front of the television cameras was the first of a run of four defeats in five games, and sent an injury-hit Vale down into mid-table. In November, Lee Harwood was forced to retire with a knee injury. Vale then went on a fifteen match unbeaten run in the league, and between 20 January and 6 March the team went on a club-record six consecutive home draws. Stoke City offered £100,000 plus incentives for Mark Chamberlain, but Chairman Don Ratcliffe called the offer 'an insult' and rejected it out of hand. Instead Tony Sealy arrived on loan, this time from Queens Park Rangers. On 6 February Mark Chamberlain scored a memorable goal at Field Mill when he stood off the pitch to avoid being caught offside, then returned to tackle a startled Rod Arnold and tap the ball into an empty net. Mansfield Town manager Stuart Boam was so enraged that the goal stood that he raced onto the pitch to verbally abuse the linesman. In March, Johnny Miller had to retire with a knee injury. On 20 March, Mark Harrison conceded 'a crazy goal' from Hull City left-back Dennis Booth at Boothferry Park, whose fifty yard free kick hit the back of the net after several bounces. Injuries hit the Vale squad and the promotion campaign faded away. On 1 May, Vale Park witnessed its lowest ever Football League attendance when a mere 1,924 turned up against York City.

They finished in seventh place with seventy points, eighteen short of fourth-placed Bournemouth. With nine away victories and twelve home draws, McGrath stated that "we blew it at Burslem". Ernie Moss was the Player of the Year and top-scorer with seventeen goals, however it was Mark Chamberlain who was selected in the PFA Fourth Division team and received a cheque for £250 when he was chosen as The Star's best player of the division.

Finances
On the financial side, a loss of £65,000 was announced, despite donations of £136,070. The overdraft stood at £235,452. Good news was that the club lottery had raised £750,000 in less than five years. McGrath released eight players and retained eleven. The club's first ever shirt sponsors were NGR Copiers. Those departing included: Peter Farrell and Gerry Keenan (Rochdale); Paul Bowles (Stockport County); Trevor Brissett (Darlington); Andy Higgins (Hartlepool United); and Ray Deakin (Burnley).

Cup competitions
In the FA Cup, Vale drew with Third Division Lincoln City at Sincil Bank and again in Burslem, and so had to play a second replay, which they won 2–0. Their clash with Stockport County was postponed seven times due to snow and fog, before the "Valiants" finally recorded a 4–1 victory on 2 January. Facing Second Division Shrewsbury Town in the Third Round, they lost by the odd goal at Gay Meadow, the "Shrews" scoring with the last kick of the match.

In the League Cup, a 1–1 draw at Edgar Street was followed by a 2–0 home win to knock Hereford United out 3–1 on aggregate. In the Second Round for the first time since 1972, they lost to Tranmere Rovers both at Prenton Park and Vale Park to exit the competition 4–1 on aggregate.

League table

Results

Port Vale's score comes first

Football League Fourth Division

Results by matchday

Matches

FA Cup

League Cup

Player statistics

Appearances

Top scorers

Transfers

Transfers in

Transfers out

Loans in

Loans out

References
Specific

General

Port Vale F.C. seasons
Port Vale